Malans railway station is a railway station in the municipality of Malans, in the Swiss canton of Grisons. It is an intermediate stop on the Rhaetian Railway  Landquart–Davos Platz line.

Services
Malans is served by regional trains and the S1 of the Chur S-Bahn:

 RegioExpress: hourly service between Disentis/Mustér and Scuol-Tarasp.
 Regio:
 Limited service to Scuol-Tarasp.
 Limited service between Landquart and Davos Platz.
 Chur S-Bahn : hourly service between Rhäzüns and Schiers.

References

External links
 
 

Railway stations in Graubünden
Rhaetian Railway stations
Railway stations in Switzerland opened in 1889